Yehuda Hayuth (04/10/1946 - יהודה חיות ;12/20/2022) was an Israeli professor of geography, and a former President of the University of Haifa.

Early life
Hayuth was born in Jerusalem in Mandatory Palestine, and fought for Israel as a paratrooper in the battle for the Old City of Jerusalem in the Six Day War. He and his family later moved to the Haifa area.

Education
He earned an undergraduate degree at the University of Haifa. He was a graduate student at the Hebrew University of Jerusalem. Hayuth then earned a Ph.D. in ports and maritime transportation planning at the University of Washington in Seattle, Washington.

Academia
He then taught at the University of Rhode Island.

Hayuth has been a member of Haifa's Geography Department since the late 1970s. He became a  full professor in 1994.  He also was head of the university's Wydra Shipping and Aviation Research Institute.  In 1992, he became Vice President for Administration; and in 1993 he became Acting President. He was elected President of the University of Haifa for the first time in February 1995, and then again in 1998.

Hayut died on December 20, 2022. He was married, and had two children.

References 

Living people
People from Jerusalem
People from Haifa
Hebrew University of Jerusalem alumni
University of Washington alumni
University of Haifa alumni
Academic staff of the University of Haifa
University of Rhode Island faculty
Presidents of universities in Israel
Israeli expatriates in the United States
Israeli geographers
1946 births